The Baldwin County School District is a public school district in Baldwin County, Georgia, United States, based in Milledgeville. It serves the communities of Milledgeville and Hardwick.

Schools
The Baldwin County School District holds grades pre-school to grade twelve, and consists of four elementary schools (two include pre-school programs), a middle school, and a high school.

Elementary schools 
Midway Hills Primary School
Lakeview Academy
Midway Hills Academy
Lakeview Primary School
 Lakeside elementary

Middle school
Oak Hill Middle School

High school
Baldwin High School

References

External links

School districts in Georgia (U.S. state)
Education in Baldwin County, Georgia